Visbur or Wisbur (Old Norse "Certain/Undoubted Son") was a legendary Swedish king of the House of Ynglings and the son of Vanlandi. He was burned to death inside his hall by the arson of two of his own sons in revenge for rejecting their mother and denying them their heritage. He was succeeded by his son Dómaldi.

Attestations
Snorri Sturluson wrote of Visbur in his Ynglinga saga (1225):

Snorri included a piece from Ynglingatal (9th century) in his account in the Heimskringla:

The Historia Norwegiæ presents a Latin summary of Ynglingatal, older than Snorri's quotation:

The even earlier source Íslendingabók cites the line of descent in Ynglingatal and also gives Visburr as the successor of Vanlandi and the predecessor of Dómaldr: vi Vanlandi. vii Visburr. viii Dómaldr.

Notes

References
McKinnell, John (2005). Meeting the Other in Norse Myth and Legend. DS Brewer.

Sources
Ynglingatal
Ynglinga saga (part of the Heimskringla)
Historia Norwegiae

Mythological kings of Sweden